John Jenkins (born 24 July 1970) is a British figure skater. He competed in the pairs event at the 1994 Winter Olympics.

References

External links
 

1970 births
Living people
British male pair skaters
Olympic figure skaters of Great Britain
Figure skaters at the 1994 Winter Olympics
Sportspeople from Nairobi